Bermuda was represented at the 2006 Commonwealth Games in Melbourne by a 44–member strong contingent comprising 26 sportspersons and 18 officials.

Medals

Athletes

Athletics
Ashley Couper, track
Latroya Darrell, high jump
Michael Donawa, track
Arantxa King, long jump
Zindzi Swan, high jump

Cycling (Road)
Tyler Barbour Butterfield
Julia Lesley Hawley
Geri Bryan Mewett

Diving
Katura Chenoa Horton-Perinchief

Gymnastics (Artistic)
Kalena Noelle Astwood
Kaisey Marie Griffith
Hannah Meriwether King
Casey Marie Lopes
Caitlyn Mello Mello

Shooting
Sinclair Charles Rayner
Ross Gladwin Eugene Roberts
Nelson Chesterfield Simons
Stewart Harry Walter Trott

Squash
Nicholas Kyme
James Stout

Swimming
Kiera Aitken
Ronald Cowen
Michael O'Connor
Graham Smith

Triathlon
Flora Jane Duffy
Karen Denise Smith

References
Bermuda athlete roster from the website of the 2006 Commonwealth Games

Bermuda at the Commonwealth Games
Nations at the 2006 Commonwealth Games
Commonwealth Games